Darin Paul Mastroianni (born August 26, 1985) is an American former professional baseball player. He played in Major League Baseball (MLB) for the Toronto Blue Jays and Minnesota Twins.

Mastroianni was born in Mount Kisco, New York and attended Fox Lane High School in Bedford, New York and then Winthrop University and University of Southern Indiana. He was drafted by the Toronto Blue Jays in the 16th round of the 2007 MLB amateur draft.

Playing career

Toronto Blue Jays
He played for the Auburn Doubledays in 2007, hitting .287 with three home runs, 26 RBI and 20 stolen bases in 68 games. In 2008, he hit .228 with three home runs, 25 RBI and 30 stolen bases for the Lansing Lugnuts. He split 2009 between the Dunedin Blue Jays and New Hampshire Fisher Cats, hitting a combined .297 with 70 stolen bases in 131 games. He played for the Fisher Cats again in 2010, hitting .301 with 46 stolen bases.

Mastroianni was called up to replace the newly acquired Kelly Johnson, who had to return to Arizona because he forgot his passport. He debuted for the Blue Jays on August 24, 2011, in center field. Mastroianni finished his debut 0-for-2 with a strikeout. He was designated for assignment before the 2012 season began.

Minnesota Twins
On February 9, 2012, he was claimed off waivers by the Minnesota Twins. He was assigned to Double-A New Britain, where he was the Opening Day left fielder. He earned his first major league hit and RBI on May 11, 2012. He hit his first major league home run on June 27, 2012.

Mastroianni's contract was purchased from the Triple-A Rochester Red Wings on April 9, 2014. He was designated for assignment eleven days later.

Second stint with Blue Jays
He was claimed off waivers by the Toronto Blue Jays on April 22, and was optioned to the Triple-A Buffalo Bisons. He was recalled by the Blue Jays on June 12, and sent back to Buffalo after appearing in 14 games, where he batted .156 with 1 home run and 2 RBI. Mastroianni was designated for assignment on September 2. He elected free agency in October 2014.

Philadelphia Phillies
On November 1, 2014, Mastroianni signed a minor-league contract with the Philadelphia Phillies.

Washington Nationals
He was traded to the Washington Nationals for cash considerations on May 5, 2015.

Second stint with Twins
He returned to the Twins on a minor league deal on December 14, 2015.

Texas Rangers
On August 16, 2016, Mastroianni signed a minor league deal with the Texas Rangers.

References

External links

1985 births
Living people
Águilas del Zulia players
American expatriate baseball players in Canada
Auburn Doubledays players
Baseball players from New York (state)
Buffalo Bisons (minor league) players
Dunedin Blue Jays players
Fort Myers Miracle players
Gulf Coast Twins players
Lansing Lugnuts players
Las Vegas 51s players
Lehigh Valley IronPigs players
Major League Baseball outfielders
Minnesota Twins players
New Britain Rock Cats players
New Hampshire Fisher Cats players
People from Mount Kisco, New York
Phoenix Desert Dogs players
Rochester Red Wings players
Southern Indiana Screaming Eagles baseball players
Syracuse Chiefs players
Toronto Blue Jays players
Winthrop Eagles baseball players